Cardiomera genei is a species of beetle in the family Carabidae, the only species in the genus Cardiomera.

References

Platyninae